The American Aircraft International Penetrator was a military helicopter prototype conceived in 1990 as a gunship conversion of the Bell UH-1 Iroquois, aimed at ground insertion, close support and counter-insurgency roles.

Design and development
A single prototype was built in 1991 but the manufacturer never won any contracts for production. It was first designed by the American Aircraft Corporation (AAC) and was marketed by a separate company, American Aircraft International (AAI).

The stated goal of the project was to convert existing Vietnam-era UH-1 airframes to upgrade them with modern armor and weapons systems, particularly targeting third-world militaries with aging fleets. This conversion could be performed at a fraction of the cost, much faster than ordering new aircraft.  The Penetrator required a crew of four (pilot, forward weapons officer, and two rear-facing weapons operators) and could carry six to eight additional passengers.

Operational history
The prototype aircraft was overhauled by Robert Laura and flying as of 2004.

References

United States military helicopters
1990s United States helicopters